Pip Ivan may refer to: 
 Pip Ivan (Chornohora)
 Pip Ivan (Maramureș)